Joseph Levine may refer to:
 Joseph E. Levine (1905–1987), American film producer
 Joseph Levine (philosopher) (born 1952), American philosopher